Niña Marie Fernando Corpuz-Rodriguez (born February 25, 1977) is a broadcast journalist of ABS-CBN News and Current Affairs. She is a reporter for newscasts TV Patrol and Bandila, The ABS-CBN News Channel (ANC), Studio 23 and www.abs-cbnnews.com. Niña anchors a news program, Balitang Europe, which airs on The Filipino Channel (TFC) and ANC. She also hosts a daily Afternoon program, Good Vibes on the network's flagship AM station, DZMM. She also used to co-host with Ogie Diaz on Magandang Umaga, Bayan.

Awards

2010 Media For Labor Rights Prize
The 2010 Media for Labour Rights Prize was awarded to Nina for her article entitled "Filipino Domestic Workers: The Struggle For Justice And Survival" about domestic workers and the threats of trafficking and abuse that they face. The award was given by the International Labour Organization's International Training Centre in Turin.

2014
Female Broadcast Journalist of the Year for Radio(Magandang Gabi Dok!)- Rotary Club of Manila Journalism Awards

Personal life
Niña is the cousin of Rocksteddy lead band vocalist, comedian & It's Showtime TV Host Teddy Corpuz.

References

Living people
1977 births
University of the Philippines Diliman alumni
ABS-CBN News and Current Affairs people
Filipino television journalists